Beugen en Rijkevoort is a former municipality in the Netherlands, in the province of North Brabant. It covered the villages of Beugen and Rijkevoort.

The municipality existed until 1942, when Beugen became part of Boxmeer and Rijkevoort of Wanroij

Former municipalities of North Brabant
Geography of Land van Cuijk